Pomp is an unincorporated community in Morgan County, Kentucky.

History
A post office called Pomp was established in 1891, and remained in operation until 1956. The community has the name of Pomp Kendall, a pioneer citizen.

References

Unincorporated communities in Morgan County, Kentucky
Unincorporated communities in Kentucky